Snakes and Ladders is a popular children's board game.

Snakes and Ladders may also refer to:

In film and television
Snakes and Ladders (1965 film), a 1965 French film
Snakes and Ladders (1980 film), a Franco-Chilean short film
Snakes and Ladders (1996 film), a 1996 Irish film
Snakes and Ladders (TV series), a 2004 TV series starring Amy Price-Francis
Snakes and Ladders (game show), a 1959 game show
Snakes and Ladders, a 1989 British TV series
"Snakes and Ladders", two episodes from the British medical drama television show Holby City, in series 3 and series 18
"Snakes and Ladders", an episode from the British drama series The Bill

In literature and publications
Snakes and Ladders, a 1978 autobiographical book by Dirk Bogarde
Snakes and Ladders, a 1994 book by Roald Dahl

In music
Snakes & Ladders Records

An album
Snakes and Ladders (Gerry Rafferty album), 1980
Snakes and Ladders / The Best of Faces, a 1976 Faces release
Snakes and Ladders (Frank Tovey album), 1986
Snakes 'n' Ladders, a 1989 Nazareth album
Snakes & Ladders (Wiley album)
Snakes & Ladders (The Tin Lids album)
Snakes and Ladders, a one-time performance and resulting CD by Alan Moore

A song
"Snakes and Ladders", a 2006 musical composition by Fred Frith
"Snakes and Ladders", a Gryphon song from the 1977 album Treason
"Snakes and Ladders", a Men at Work song from the 1985 album Two Hearts
"Snakes and Ladders", a song from Joni Mitchell's 1988 album Chalk Mark in a Rain Storm
"Snakes and Ladders", alternate title for the 2003 Radiohead song "Sit Down. Stand Up."
"Snakes and Ladders", a song from Joss Stone's 2004 studio album Mind Body & Soul
"Snakes and Ladders", a song on the 2007 Switches album Heart Tuned to D.E.A.D.